Where the Pavement Ends is a 1923 American silent South Seas romantic drama film directed by Rex Ingram on location in Cuba and starring his wife Alice Terry and Ramón Novarro as lovers. The film was produced and distributed by Metro Pictures. It is now considered to be a lost film. Shooting began in September 1922, at Hialeah Studios in Miami, Florida, yet another source says the film was shot in Coconut Grove, Florida.

Cast
 Alice Terry as Matilda Spener
 Ramón Novarro as Motauri
 Edward Connelly as Pastor Spener
 Harry T. Morey as Captain Hull Gregson
 John George as Napuka Joe, servant to Gregson

See also
List of lost films

References

External links

Lobby card at movieposters.ha.com
John Russell, Where the Pavement Ends (1923 ed.), with film stills at the front piece and on pages 32, 64, and 224, from the Internet Archive

1923 films
American silent feature films
Films directed by Rex Ingram
Lost American films
Metro Pictures films
American romantic drama films
1923 romantic drama films
American black-and-white films
Films shot in Cuba
Films shot in Florida
1923 lost films
Lost romantic drama films
1920s American films
Films with screenplays by John Russell (screenwriter)
Silent romantic drama films
Silent American drama films